Ubon Ratchathani University (UBU) (Thai, มหาวิทยาลัยอุบลราชธานี) was established as a campus of Khon Kaen University, Thailand, in 1987. It gained independent university status in 1990.

History 

Ubon Ratchathani University (UBU) was founded in 1987 as a regional campus of Khon Kaen University. It was established as a university by the Royal Charter in 1990.

Semester times
UBU mainly operates on a two-semester program. For Academic Year 2020, semester 1 is from 22 June 2020 to 30 October 2020 and Semester 2 is from 9 November 2020 to 20 March 2021. There are few courses in the summer semester which is from 5 April 2021 to 22 May 2021.

Academic

Faculties and College 
Health Sciences 
Faculty of Nursing
Faculty of Pharmaceutical Sciences
College of Medicine and Public Health

Sciences and Technology
Faculty of Agriculture
Faculty of Engineering
Faculty of Science

Humanities and Social Sciences 
Faculty of Applied Arts and Architecture
Faculty of Law
Faculty of Liberal Arts
Faculty of Management Science (Ubon Ratchathani Business School)
Faculty of Political Science

English Programs 
 International Business Management (BBA) at Ubon Ratchathani Business School 
 Commerce and International Marketing  
 Supply Chain Management
 Business English (BA) at Faculty of Liberal Arts

Notable alumni
 Srimuang Charoensiri - Former Minister of Education  
 Pracha Prasobdee - Former Deputy Minister of Interior

References

External links 
Ubon Ratchathani University (English)
มหาวิทยาลัยอุบลราชธานี (Thai)

Isan
Ubon Ratchathani University
Buildings and structures in Ubon Ratchathani province
Educational institutions established in 1990
1990 establishments in Thailand